General Lord Charles Henry Somerset Manners, KCB (24 October 1780 – 25 May 1855) was a British soldier and nobleman, the second son of Charles Manners, 4th Duke of Rutland and Lady Mary Somerset.

He was lieutenant colonel of the 3rd in 1815, during the Waterloo campaign. After a brief appointment to the colonelcy of the 11th Regiment of (Light) Dragoons,  he was transferred to the colonelcy of the 3rd (King's Own) Regiment of Dragoons which he retained until his death in 1855.

References

External links 
 

1780 births
1855 deaths
British Army generals
British Army personnel of the Napoleonic Wars
Knights Commander of the Order of the Bath
Members of the Parliament of the United Kingdom for English constituencies
Younger sons of dukes
UK MPs 1802–1806
UK MPs 1806–1807
UK MPs 1807–1812
UK MPs 1812–1818
UK MPs 1818–1820
UK MPs 1820–1826
UK MPs 1826–1830
UK MPs 1835–1837
UK MPs 1837–1841
UK MPs 1841–1847
UK MPs 1847–1852
Charles
11th Hussars officers
3rd The King's Own Hussars officers